Thomas Graul (born March 15, 1962) is a German former professional ice hockey player.

Graul competed at both the 1983 and 1985 World Ice Hockey Championships as a member of the East German team.

References

External links

1962 births
Living people
ETC Crimmitschau players
Eisbären Berlin players
German ice hockey players
Ice hockey people from Berlin